Ezhuthachan(), also known as Kadupattan() is a caste native to the Indian state of Kerala. It is classified as an Other Backward Class by the Government of India under its system of positive discrimination.

They mainly belong to the districts of Thrissur, Palakkad, Malappuram and Kozhikode of Kerala, has also presence outside and other parts of India. There are more people in the teaching sector in the community. Ezhuthachan is a caste who have teaching as a traditional profession. There is an organization representing the community as Ezhuthachan Samajam.

Genesis
There are two main beliefs about the origin of the Kadupattan people.1. Pattar(Bhattar) Brahmins who were boycotted from Kadu village of medieval Chola, Pandya region, Due to the introduction of Buddhism. From the Zamorin's Kovilakam (Ambadi Kovilakam) the elder Thamburatti(Senior princess) asserted the title Ezhuthachan and assigned as village school master.2. A Jain guild, who was prominent in teaching, came to Kerala and became Village school teachers. With the influence of the Bhakthi movement, they came under Hinduism.

History
The Kaduru (In present Karnataka) of the Western Ganga dynasty was a Jainite settlement; From 8th to 10th centuries Jainism was the prominent religion in the Western Ganga dynasty. From 9th to 13th centuries today's the Patancheru or Pottalakkare in Telangana was the principal Jain hub in South India. In Jainism, there was a tradition of using the province name once abandoned as clan name. Evidence suggests that Kadupattan was a Jain guild that formed Kaduru and Patancheru which was prominent in the teaching profession.

After the twelfth century, Prominence of Jainism in South India decreased significantly, Many followers of Jainism abandoned their settlements and moved to the south (Today's Tamil Nadu). Kadupattigal one among thirteenth century rulers of the southern Arcot who were present on the banks of Kaveri River should have been the ancestors of Ezhuthachan(Kadupattan).

Wars that took place during the course of thirteenth and fourteenth centuries (Sadayavarman Sundara Pandyan I and Kakatiya, Delhi Sultanate), Caused Kadupattans came to Kerala through the path which was present from banks of Kaveri through the Nilgiri mountains, and with the influence of the Bhakti movement they were Hinduised as Vaishnava(Ramanuja), Shaiva and Shaktheya; In Occupation Ezhuthachan (Village school master), Teachers who practiced Shakthi worship became known as Gurukkal. Historian K. Balakrishna Kurup concludes history of Ezhuthachan(Kadupattan) caste as this.

It is believed that the Kadupattans reached Malabar by the fifteenth century( C.E 1447). Although the Aithihyamala says about a magician(Chembra Makku Ezhuthachan) who belonged to Kadupattan caste a disciple of the Kakkassery Bhattathiri and member of a family who had been a teacher of traditional heritage, his lifespan is unclear. One of the first government records which mentions the Ezhutachan caste is the British India census taken on 17 February 1881.

Kadupattans entered Kerala through Palakkad Gap, Their migration took place as number of groups of families. First group of eight families(Ettu veettukar) came and settled near Tirunavaya in Malabar region, some of their family names were Thekkeppattu, Vadakkeppattu, Kizhakkeppattu, Padinjareppattu, Meleppattu, Keezheppattu. Family of Chembra Ezhuthachan belongs to the tradition of Ettu veettukar. And the second group of thirty two families(Muppaththirandu veettukaar) settled in Thrissur region. Soon after another group of close relatives of Ettu veettukar and Muppaththirandu veettukaar settled in Palakkad region. Gradually they spread to other areas. Clashes between soldiers of Zamorin and Portuguese India Armadas that took place during sixteenth century on coastal areas of Malabar region, caused many Kadupattans who were inhabitants of coastal areas of Kingdom of Tanur to move to Kanniyampuram of Valluvanad (southern Malabar)(In present Ottappalam taluk), Chittur and other parts of Kingdom of Cochin and settle there.

Kadupattans played major role in spreading Vattezhuthu in Palakkad, Malabar regions and Kingdom of Cochin. Usually they were well-versed in sanskrit too. Kadupattans used the prayer of Jain Tirthankara jina dheva(Namosthu jeenathe) in their Ezhuthupalli(), And taught Vattezhuthu, Mathematics etc.

According to historian M. G. S. Narayanan the literary activities of Malabar, especially in Sudras got strengthened after the arrival of Kadupattars. Translation of many texts from Sanskrit to Malayalam took place in the age after the arrival of them.

In Kerala they were treated as shudra. But it was permitted to go and pray until the Sacrificial stone(Balikkallu) of temple. Some of the other communities called the men of the community Pattarappan() and the women as Pattathiyaramma(). In government records Kadupattans referred as the Choular(People from the Chola country).
It is believed that Zamorin had placed them in a high position in society . The envy of the Zamorin's minister (Mangattachan) have put them under the burden of low class shudra in society. Pattanam pizhaithavar(Those who lost status)Kadupattans were called by the other community like that. Although Ezhuthachan caste very similar to those of Nair(Even though some records classify them as Nair), they have nothing to do with the Nair community. Perhaps they have adopted to the traditional methods present in Kerala after arrival.

Till the introduction of public education system in Kerala, Kadupattans were present in Kingdom of Cochin and Malabar as Ezhuthachan(Village school master) and they ran Ezhuthupallis(Traditional village school).  They taught wealthy people by staying at their home and this practice was called Ezhuthachan thamasikkuka().
Traditionally, although caste gave importance to teaching, other tasks such as palanquin bearing, carrying salt, oil, and their marketing, agriculture etc. were also present.
Famous Magicians, Physicians, Astrologers and Sanskrit scholars have been emerged from this caste. Panikkar was the title which used by some kadupattans.

After the introduction of modern public education system, traditional teaching methods were less important in the society. Many Ezhuthupallis(Traditional Village school) that ran by Ezhuthachans(Kadupattan) were converted to public school with modern teaching method. In the 19th century when British rule introduced public education in Malabar, Ezhuthachan community made major contributions in the field of public education of Valluvanad.

Physical Appearance 
The skin complexion of Ezhuthachans(Kaduppattan) varies from dark to inter linked black and white. Edgar Thurston observes that they are 'dark & white skinned people, medium in stature, with simple nose and curly or wavy hair'.

Customs, Inheritance and Worship methods

Though there are little differences in customs locally, Nearly Tamil practices followed. According to William logan's Malabar manual this caste followed a Modified Makkathayam (Patriarchy / Patrilineal system of inheritance) in which the property descends from father to son but not from father to daughter. At the wedding ceremonies there are rituals like Ganapathy homam(ritual dedicated to Lord Ganesha, performed to seek his blessings), Dhakshina giving(Give donation to elders and seek blessings) and Panigrahanam(The groom holds the hand of the bride). There was no Polygamy and Polyandry prevailed, but widow remarried. Peculiarities in death rituals of Ezhuthachan caste, Points they were foreign caste. Ezhuthachan caste worshiped Ganapathy, Vettakkorumakan, Shakti, Bhagavati, Vishnumaya.

It is believed that Adi Shankara instructed Kadupattans in Shakti worship; Even now their descendants follow this tradition and claim it is inherited from their forefathers.

Ezhuthachan Samajam

Ezhuthachan Samajam started functioning from 1906 onwards. The first organizer was a Sanskrit scholar and a teacher Mr.Chakkulliyal Kunjunni Ezhuthachan who was a disciple of legendary Sanskrit scholar and teacher. Revered Punnasseri Nambi Neelakanta Sharma. He named the organization as Adhyapaka Samajam. Though Adhyapaka Samajam made several reformations in caste customs and rituals, Kunjunni Ezhuthachan's efforts were not successful and he abandoned his project. Ezhuthachan samajam came in to being as a reality when Late Vakil P. Kumaran Ezhuthachan entered the arena. He was the real founder of the Ezhuthachan Samajam and architect of the present day Ezhuthachan community. He was also a freedom fighter, a member of the congress party and also in Cochin State Prajamandal, whose founder was Sri.V.R.Krishnan Ezhuthachan, his son-in-law. Later Mr.Krishnan Ezhuthachan stepped into the shoes of his mentor and father-in-law, Mr. Kumaran Ezhuthachan as Ezhuthachan Samajam president. Since both were immersed in Congress politics, freedom movement, peasant struggles and also in Cochin state Prajamandal, they found it difficult to continue in the Ezhuthachan Samajam movement. Towards late 1940s Krishnan Ezhuthachan left the movement, so also Vakil. P. Kumaran Ezhuthachan. Kumaran Ezhuthachan left the movement after a personal tragedy - The death of his son P.Lakshmanakumar. After 1947 the Ezhuthachan community was orphaned and community became rudderless. There were some attempts to revitalize the community by some spirited people, but it didn't reach anywhere. The services of Adv. Late M. Krishnankutty is to be mentioned in this context. In the Post era, from 1990s onwards there was some resurgence in the community. From late 1990s new thinking is visible in the community. From 2002, Mr.T.G.Ravi came into the scene and revitalized the samajam activities. The present president Prof. Dr. Lakshmanakumar is the grandson of Vakil. P. Kumaran Ezhuthachan and son of V R. Krishnan Ezhuthachan.

There are educational institutions under Ezhuthachan Samajam.

Then the organizations on behalf of ezhuthachan community were formed and functioned from all India to regional level. The last organization to be formed in that category is the Palakkad Ezhuthachan samudhaya trust based in Palakkad.

Thunchaththu Ezhuthachan

There is no clear history about birth or life of Thunchaththu Ezhuthachan. However, there is a belief prevails as Thunchathth Ramanujan Ezhuthachan was a member of Ezhuthachan (Kadupattan) community. Being a vaishnava(Ramanuja) sect member he was called as Ramanujan. And his real name was Thunchan(The youngest child). According to K. Balakrishna Kurup, Thunchchath Ezhuthachan was a member of Ezhuthachan(Kadupattan) community and Ezhuthachan led his life as a teacher by following celibacy throughout his life.
 E. P. Bhaskara Guptan a writer and
independent researcher in local history from Kadampazhipuram, Palakkad; supports conclusion of K. Balakrishna Kurup about Thunchathth Ezhuthachan's caste. Historian Velayudhan Panikkassery also expressing the same opinion.

Historian M. G. S. Narayanan point out mention about Jain monks in Adhyathma ramayanam kilippattu as proof for Thunchaththu ezhuthachan's familiarity with Jain monks.

Notable people
V. R. Krishnan Ezhuthachan
A. M. Paraman
P. Kumaran Ezhuthachan
K. N. Ezhuthachan
E. K. Krishnan Ezhuthachan
C. N. Balakrishnan
T. G. Ravi
Chembra Ezhuthachanmar

References

Notes

Citations

Further reading

External links
Read Viśvāsattinte Kāṇāppuṟaṅṅaḷ(വിശ്വാസത്തിന്റെ കാണാപ്പുറങ്ങൾ)
Akhila Kerala Ezhuthachan Samajam Website
Articles about Thunchathth Ezhuthachan's caste

Social groups of Kerala
Indian castes
Malayali people
Other Backward Classes
Ethnic groups in India